Northern Ireland Open may refer to:

Northern Ireland Open (darts), a professional darts tournament
Northern Ireland Open (golf), a golf tournament on the Challenge Tour
Northern Ireland Open (snooker), a professional snooker tournament